The 1994 Spengler Cup was held in Davos, Switzerland from December 26 to December 31, 1994.  All matches were played at HC Davos's home arena, Eisstadion Davos. The final was won 3–0 by Färjestads BK over HC Davos.

Teams participating
 Färjestads BK
 HC Davos
 Team Canada
 Traktor Chelyabinsk
 HIFK

Tournament

Round-Robin results

Finals

External links
Spenglercup.ch

1994-95
1994–95 in Swiss ice hockey
1994–95 in Russian ice hockey
1994–95 in Canadian ice hockey
1994–95 in Finnish ice hockey
1994–95 in Swedish ice hockey
December 1994 sports events in Europe